Marion "Sugar" Cain (born February 4, 1914, date of death unknown) was an American baseball pitcher in the Negro leagues. He played professionally from 1937 to 1957. He had stints with the Pittsburgh Crawfords and Brooklyn Royal Giants from 1937 to 1940 before playing for the Oakland Larks in the West Coast Negro Baseball Association in 1946. Cain played for the Minot Mallards in the Manitoba-Dakota League from 1951 to 1957.

References

External links
 and Seamheads

1914 births
Year of death missing
Pittsburgh Crawfords players
Brooklyn Royal Giants players
Oakland Larks players
Minot Mallards players
Baseball pitchers